Ashton is a village in West Northamptonshire about  southeast of Roade village close to the Northampton to Milton Keynes A508, ca. south of junction 15 of the M1 motorway,  south of Northampton and  north of Milton Keynes. The population of the civil parish at the 2011 census was 395. The West Coast Main Line intersects the village on its eastern side.

The villages name means 'At the ash-trees'.

Governance
The village has a Parish Council and the Ashton website publishes name of councillors and their proceedings.

Notable buildings
The church is dedicated to St Michael with the oldest parts 13th and 14th century. It was extensively restored in 1895. There are various monuments:
 Sir Philip de Lou (d.14th century)
 Sir John de Herteshull (c.1365)
 Robert Marriot (d.1584) and his family

The popular pub the Old Crown Inn, on Stoke Road also serves meals.

The village has a single Church of England primary school: Ashton C of E Primary School.

References

External links

 
 

Villages in Northamptonshire
West Northamptonshire District
Civil parishes in Northamptonshire